Sportklub Union Ertl Glas Amstetten is a professional association football club based in the town of Amstetten, Lower Austria, that competes in the Austrian Football Second League, the second tier of the Austrian football league system. Founded in 1997, it is affiliated to the Lower Austrian Football Association. The team plays its home matches at Union-Platz, where it has been based since its foundation.

History
The club was formed in 1997 from a merger of two local clubs; former second division club ASK Amstetten, founded in 1932, and SC Union Amstetten, founded in 1946. Existing rivalries were pushed aside as a new board was founded by members of both clubs headed by chairman Rodolf Brunner. In the 2007–08 season, the club was promoted to the third highest league, the Austrian Regionalliga before being directly relegated to the 1. Niederösterreichische Landesliga again. In 2011, the club returned to the Regionalliga, where they established themselves until the 2017–18 season, where they managed to win promotion to the Austrian Football Second League for the first time.

Cup performances
After their first successful performance in the Austrian Cup in the 2013–14 season as a Regionalliga side – a victory over the second division club SV Mattersburg and reaching the quarter-finals – they managed to knock out Austria Lustenau in the 2016–17 Austrian Cup, a club playing at the professional level. After a 2–2 draw in regular time, they won the penalty shoot-out. Before that, in the 2015–16 Austrian Cup season, Amstetten had narrowly lost to Rapid Wien on penalties in the second round.

Stadium

The club plays at the modernised Union-Platz stadium, which has a capacity of 3,000.

Current squad

Staff

Technical staff

Source: SKU Amstetten

References

External links

  
 SKU Amstetten at the Austrian Football Association 

Association football clubs established in 1997
Football clubs in Austria
1997 establishments in Austria